"Si Estuvieras Conmigo" is a single by Salvadoran singer Álvaro Torres released on 1990 through EMI Latin as part of Torres' ninth studio album Si Estuvieras Conmigo. The song was written by Torres, produced by Bebu Silvetti and it was recorded in Rusk Sound Studios, Los Angeles. 

The song was a success in Latin America and the United States, peaking at number 9 in August 1990 on the Billboard Hot Latin Tracks chart.

Personnel 
Credits adapted from Si Estuvieras Conmigo liner notes.

Vocals

Álvaro Torres – lead vocals
Kenny O'Brien – backing vocals
Maria Del Rey – backing vocals
Michel Jimenez – backing vocals
Nina Swan – backing vocals

Musicians

 Bebu Silvetti – arrangements, conducting, piano, keyboards
José Peña – bass guitar
Ezra Kliger – coordination
Suzie Katayama – copyist
Grant Geissman – guitar
John Yoakum – tenor saxophone
Alan Kaplan – trombone
Charlie Davis – trumpet
Ramon Flores – trumpet

Production

Bebu Silvetti – production
Elton Ahi – mixing
Eric Scheda – mixing
Boon Heng Tam – engineering assistance
Gustavo Borner – engineering assistance

Recording

 Recorded and mixed at Rusk Sound Studios, Los Angeles

Charts

Weekly charts

Covers
In 1997, Panamanian salsa singer Roberto Blades covered "Si Estuvieras Conmigo" on his album En Buena Hora. This version peaked at number 16 on the Billboard Tropical Songs chart.

References

External links
Lyrics of this song at Musixmatch

1990 singles
1997 singles
Álvaro Torres songs
Songs written by Álvaro Torres
Spanish-language songs
EMI Latin singles
1990s ballads
Pop ballads
Rock ballads
Salsa songs